Curley is a surname, given name, nickname or stage name. It may refer to:

Surname 

 August Curley (born 1960), American football player
 Arthur Curley (1938 – 1998), American librarian
 Barney Curley (1939 – 2021), Irish racehorse trainer
 Bill Curley (born 1972), American basketball coach and player
 Billy Curley (born 1945), English former footballer 
 Brian Curley (born 1959), American golf course architect
 Carlo Curley (1952–2012), American concert organist
 Cindy Curley (born 1963), American ice hockey coach, executive and player
 Craig Curley (born 1988), Native American distance runner
 Dan Curley (born 1979), American football player
 Daniel Curley (1918 – 1988), American novelist and short story writer
 Daniel Joseph Curley (1869 – 1932), American prelate
 Edward W. Curley (1873–1940), American politician
Ian Curley (born 1972), British auto racing driver
 Jack Curley (born Jacques Armand Schuel, 1876 - 1937), American sports promoter 
 James Curley (disambiguation)
 James Curley (astronomer) (1796–1889), Irish-American astronomer
 James Curley (Australian politician) (1846–1913), Australian politician
 James Michael Curley (1874–1958), Governor and U.S. Representative from Massachusetts and mayor of Boston
 John Curley (born 1938), Journalism professor, newspaper editor and publisher
 John Curley (musician), (born 1965), American musician
 John P. Curley (1891 – 1973), American college athletics administrator
 Johnny Curley (1897 – 1982), English boxer
 Leo Curley (1915 – 1950), American politician (son of James Michael Curley)
 Maddy Curley (born 1981), American actress and former gymnast
 Marianne Curley (born 1959), Australian author
 Martha A.Q. Curley (born 1952), American nurse
 Matt Curley (born 1983) American ice hockey coach and player
 Michael Joseph Curley (1879–1947), Irish-born Catholic Archbishop of Baltimore and Washington
 Michael Curley (footballer) (1912–1973), English footballer
 Mick Curley, Gaelic football referee
 Pauline Curley (1903 – 2000), American vaudeville and silent film actress
 Pauline Curley (athlete), (born 1969), Irish marathon runner
 Patricia S. Curley (born 1946), American jurist
 Rob Curley (born 1971), American executive
 Robert M. Curley (1922–2001), American jurist and legislator
 Sean Curley (born 1995), American actor
 Simon Curley (1917 – 1989), Irish cricketer
 Timothy Curley (born 1954), athletic director 
 Thomas Curley (disambiguation)
 Thomas Curley (Wisconsin general) (1825–1904), Irish American Civil War general and politician
 Thomas Curley (sound engineer) (born 1976), American production sound mixer
 Tom Curley (born 1948), American journalist
 Tom Curley (footballer), (born 1945), Scottish footballer 
 Todd Curley (born 1973), Australian rules footballer
 Walter Curley (1922 – 2016), American Ambassador
 Doc Curley, nickname of Walter James Curley (1874–1920), American professional baseball player
 William Curley (born 1971), Scottish patissier and chocolatier

First name, nickname or stage name

 Curley Andrews, nickname for William Andrews (fl. 1943 – 1944), American baseball player
 Curley Bridges (1934 – 2014), American singer, pianist and songwriter
 Curley Byrd, nickname of Harry Clifton Byrd (1889–1970), American sports coach and university administrator
 Curley Christian, nickname of Ethelbert Christian (likely 1882 – 1954), Black Canadian First World War veteran and activist
 Curley Culp (born 1963), American football player
 Curley Davis, nickname for Volney Davis (1902 – 1982), American bank robber
 Curley Headed Doctor (1828 — 1890), Native American spiritual leader 
 Curley Fletcher, nickname of Carmen William Fletcher (1892—1954), American composer of cowboy songs and cowboy poetry
 Curley G, stage name of Xilinnayi Gao (born 1998), Chinese singer-songwriter
 Curley Hallman Hudson Hallman (born 1947), American football player and coach
 Curley "Boo" Johnson (born 1965), American basketball player
 John Curley Johnson (born 1935), American Football League and National Football League punter
 Curley Jones, nickname of Ralph Jones (1880 – 1951), American football and basketball coach
 Curley Mitchell, nickname of French Mitchell, American fiddler
 Curley Money, nickname of Robert Earnest Money (1925 – 2003), American rockabilly musician
 Curley Moore, nickname of June Moore (1943 – 1985), American R&B singer
 Curley Russell, nickname of Dillon Russell (1917-1986), American jazz double-bassist
 Curley Walker, nickname of Cornelius Walker (4 February 1894 – 1973), British boxer
 Curley Weaver, also known as Slim Gordon (1906 – 1962), American blues musician
 Curley Williams, nickname of Dock Williams (1914 – 1970) was an American country and western musician and songwriter

Middle name
 Wesley Curley Clark, fullname of W. C. Clark (born 1939), American blues musician
 Kay Curley Bennett (1922–1997) Navajo artist and writer

Fictional characters 
 "Curley", in the Bluey and Curley comic strip drawn by Alex Gurney
 Curley, in John Steinbeck's 1937 novel Of Mice and Men
 William "Curley" Benson, the lead character in two Our Gang spin-off films, Curley (1947) and Who Killed Doc Robbin (1948)

See also

Carley (name)
Corley (surname)
Culley (given name)
Curlee (name)
Curly, name list
Curli, protein
Curtley (given name)
McCurley